The 2014–15 Memphis Grizzlies season was the 20th season of the franchise in the NBA and their 14th in Memphis.

The Grizzlies were strong for most of the season, and led the Southwest Division for most of the season, but faltered during the month of April and surrendered the division lead to the Rockets. The Grizzlies finished second in the Southwest Division with the second best record in franchise history at 55–27 and fifth in the Western Conference.

In the first round, they defeated the Portland Trail Blazers in five games. The Grizzlies' season ended with a 2–4 Semifinals loss to eventual NBA champion Golden State Warriors.

Preseason

Draft picks

Regular season

Standings

Game log

Preseason

|- style="background:#fcc;"
| 1 || October 8 || @ Milwaukee
| 
| Jon Leuer (11)
| Marc Gasol (7)
| Conley, Adams & Udrih (3)
| BMO Harris Bradley Center4,685
| 0–1
|- style="background:#fcc;"
| 2 || October 9 || @ Houston
|  
| Jarnell Stokes (12)
| Earl Clark (6)
| Leuer, Clark, Pondexter & Calathes (3)
| Toyota Center15,301
| 0–2
|- style="background:#cfc;"
| 3 || October 11 || Atlanta
| 
| Mike Conley (23)
| Marc Gasol (13)
| Zach Randolph (5)
| FedExForum11,867
| 1–2
|- style="background:#fcc;"
| 4 || October 14 || @ Oklahoma City
|   
| Quincy Pondexter (16)
| Jon Leuer (7)
| Jon Leuer (4)
| Chesapeake Energy Arenaunknown
| 1–3
|- style="background:#cfc;"
| 5 || October 17 || Flamengo
| 
| Marc Gasol (15)
| Zach Randolph (8)
| Mike Conley (7)
| FedExForum10,969
| 2–3
|- style="background:#fcc;"
| 6 || October 20 || @ Dallas
| 
| Quincy Pondexter (18)
| Gasol & Whiteside (7)
| Mike Conley (4)
| American Airlines Center16,402
| 2–4
|- style="background:#cfc;"
| 7 || October 22 || Cleveland
| 
| Marc Gasol (16)
| Marc Gasol (9)
| Conley & Calathes (4)
| FedExForum12,073
| 3–4
|- style="background:#fcc;"
| 8 || October 24 || Miami
| 
| Jon Leuer (21)
| Kosta Koufos (8)
| Mike Conley (4)
| FedExForum10,843
| 3–5

Regular season

|- style="background:#cfc;"
| 1 || October 29 || Minnesota
| 
| Marc Gasol (32)
| Zach Randolph (13)
| Mike Conley (6)
| FedExForum17,731
| 1–0
|- style="background:#cfc;"
| 2 || October 31 || @ Indiana
| 
| Zach Randolph (22)
| Zach Randolph (13)
| Mike Conley (4)
| Bankers Life Fieldhouse14,441
| 2–0

|- style="background:#cfc;"
| 3 || November 1 || @ Charlotte
| 
| Marc Gasol (22)
| Zach Randolph (12)
| Mike Conley (7)
| Time Warner Cable Arena18,133
| 3–0
|- style="background:#cfc;"
| 4 || November 3 || New Orleans
| 
| Marc Gasol (16)
| Randolph, Gasol & Allen (11)
| Mike Conley (5)
| FedExForum15,302
| 4–0
|- style="background:#cfc;"
| 5 || November 5 || @ Phoenix
| 
|  Mike Conley (24)
|  Randolph & Leuer (6)
|  Mike Conley (11)
| US Airways Center15,377
| 5–0
|- style="background:#cfc;"
| 6 || November 7 || @ Oklahoma City
| 
|  Mike Conley (20)
|  Marc Gasol (9)
|  Mike Conley (5)
| Chesapeake Energy Arena18,203
| 6–0
|- style="background:#fcc;"
| 7 || November 8 ||  @ Milwaukee
| 
|  Zach Randolph  (22)
|  Zach Randolph  (14)
|  Mike Conley (4)
|  BMO Harris Bradley Center13,841
| 6–1
|- style="background:#cfc;"
| 8 || November 11 || L.A. Lakers
| 
| Mike Conley (23)
| Zach Randolph  (10)
| Marc Gasol (9)
| FedExForum17,618
| 7–1
|- style="background:#cfc;"
| 9 || November 13 || Sacramento
| 
|  Mike Conley (22)
|  Zach Randolph  (8)
|  Mike Conley (11)
| FedExForum15,666
| 8–1
|- style="background:#cfc;"
| 10 || November 15 || Detroit
| 
| Marc Gasol (23)
| Zach Randolph (22)
| Randolph & Conley (4)
| FedExForum17,215
| 9–1
|- style="background:#cfc;"
| 11 || November 17 || Houston
| 
|  Mike Conley (19)
|  Zach Randolph  (7)
|  Conley & Udrih (6)
| FedExForum17,012
| 10–1
|- style="background:#fcc;"
| 12 || November 19 || @ Toronto
| 
| Marc Gasol (22)
| Zach Randolph (18)
|  Mike Conley (5)
| Air Canada Centre19,800
| 10–2
|- style="background:#cfc;"
| 13 || November 21 || Boston
| 
| Marc Gasol (30)
| Zach Randolph (12)
| Mike Conley (7)
| FedExForum17,712
| 11–2
|- style="background:#cfc;"
| 14 || November 23 || L.A. Clippers
| 
| Marc Gasol (30)
| Marc Gasol (12)
| Mike Conley (8)
| FedExForum18,119
| 12–2
|- style="background:#cfc;"
| 15 || November 26 || @ L.A. Lakers
|  
| Conley & Gasol (19)
| Marc Gasol (11)
| Mike Conley (7)
| Staples Center18,997
| 13–2
|- style="background:#cfc;"
| 16 || November 28 || @ Portland
|  
| Marc Gasol (26)
| Zach Randolph (13)
| Conley & Gasol (9)
| Moda Center19,459
| 14–2
|- style="background:#cfc;"
| 17 || November 30 || @ Sacramento
|  
|  Zach Randolph  (22)
|  Zach Randolph  (12)
|  Mike Conley (6)
| Sleep Train Arena16,240
| 15–2

|- style="background:#fcc;"
| 18 || December 3 || @ Houston
| 
| Mike Conley (15)
| Marc Gasol (7)
| Conley & Calathes (6)
| Toyota Center18,151
| 15–3
|- style="background:#fcc;"
| 19 || December 5 || San Antonio
| 
| Marc Gasol (28)
| Marc Gasol (12)
| Mike Conley (10)
| FedExForum18,119
| 15–4
|- style="background:#cfc;"
| 20 || December 7 || Miami
| 
| Jon Leuer (20)
| Jon Leuer (12)
| Marc Gasol (7)
| FedExForum16,572
| 16–4
|- style="background:#cfc;"
| 21 || December 9 || Dallas
| 
| Marc Gasol (30)
| Zach Randolph  (13)
| Marc Gasol (6)
| FedExForum16,512
| 17–4
|- style="background:#cfc;"
| 22 || December 12 || Charlotte
| 
| Zach Randolph  (20)
| Zach Randolph  (11)
| Conley & Udrih (6)
| FedExForum15,897
| 18–4
|- style="background:#cfc;"
| 23 || December 13 || @ Philadelphia
| 
| Mike Conley (36)
| Zach Randolph (11)
| Mike Conley (9)
| Wells Fargo Center13,698
| 19–4
|- style="background:#cfc;"
| 24 || December 16 || Golden State
| 
| Marc Gasol (24)
| Zach Randolph (10)
| Beno Udrih (8)
| FedExForum18,119
| 20–4
|- style="background:#cfc;"
| 25 || December 17 || @ San Antonio
| 
| Marc Gasol (26)
| Zach Randolph  (21)
| Mike Conley (10)
| AT&T Center18,581
| 21–4
|- style="background:#fcc;"
| 26 || December 19 || Chicago
| 
| Mike Conley (21)
| Zach Randolph  (12)
| Marc Gasol (3)
| FedExForum18,119
| 21–5
|- style="background:#fcc;"
| 27 || December 21 || @ Cleveland
| 
| Marc Gasol (23)
| Marc Gasol (11)
| Gasol, Conley & Udrih (5)
| Quicken Loans Arena20,562
| 21–6
|- style="background:#fcc;"
| 28 || December 22 || Utah
| 
| Mike Conley (28)
| Marc Gasol (12)
| Marc Gasol (5)
| FedExForum16,991
| 21–7
|- style="background:#fcc;"
| 29 || December 26 || Houston
| 
| Marc Gasol (29)
| Tayshaun Prince (9)
| Mike Conley (7)
| FedExForum18,119
| 21–8
|- style="background:#cfc;"
| 30 || December 27 || @ Miami
| 
| Mike Conley (24)
| Marc Gasol (10)
| Tayshaun Prince (5)
| American Airlines Arena19,744
| 22–8
|- style="background:#cfc;"
| 31 || December 30 || San Antonio
|  
| Mike Conley (30)
| Marc Gasol (9)
| Mike Conley (6)
| FedExForum18,119
| 23–8

|- style="background:#cfc;"
| 32 || January 2 || @ L.A. Lakers
|  
| Mike Conley (30)
| Marc Gasol (10)
| Mike Conley (9)
| Staples Center18,997
| 24–8
|- style="background:#fcc;"
| 33 || January 3 || @ Denver
| 
| Marc Gasol (18)
| Kosta Koufos (9)
| Conley & Calathes (5)
| Pepsi Center16,350
| 24–9
|- style="background:#cfc;"
| 34 || January 5 || New York
| 
| Mike Conley (22)
| Marc Gasol (8)
| Mike Conley (7)
| FedExForum16,888
| 25–9
|- style="background:#fcc;"
| 35 || January 7 || @ Atlanta
| 
| Mike Conley (17)
| Mike Conley (9)
| Mike Conley (6)
| Philips Arena17,126
| 25–10
|- style="background:#fcc;"
| 36 || January 9 || @ New Orleans
|  
| Conley & Gasol (19)
| Zach Randolph  (11)
| Mike Conley (7)
| Smoothie King Center17,639
| 25–11
|- style="background:#cfc;"
| 37 || January 11 || Phoenix
| 
| Zach Randolph (27)
| Zach Randolph (17)
| Mike Conley (8)
| FedExForum17,212
| 26–11
|- style="background:#cfc;"
| 38 || January 14 || @ Brooklyn
| 
| Zach Randolph (20)
| Zach Randolph (14)
| Randolph, Lee & Calathes (3)
| Barclays Center16,516
| 27–11
|- style="background:#cfc;"
| 39 || January 16 || @ Orlando
| 
| Jeff Green (21)
| Marc Gasol (16)
| Marc Gasol (8)
| Amway Center18,141
| 28–11
|- style="background:#cfc;"
| 40 || January 17 || Portland
| 
| Zach Randolph (20)
| Zach Randolph (15)
| Marc Gasol (6)
| FedExForum18,119
| 29–11
|- style="background:#fcc;"
| 41 || January 19 || Dallas
| 
| Mike Conley (22)
| Zach Randolph (15)
| Conley & Gasol (4)
| FedExForum18,119
| 29–12
|- style="background:#cfc;"
| 42 || January 21 || Toronto
| 
| Marc Gasol (26)
| Zach Randolph (13)
| Marc Gasol (5)
| FedExForum15,112
| 30–12
|- style="background:#cfc;"
| 43 || January 24 || Philadelphia
| 
| Jeff Green (18)
| Zach Randolph (14)
| Beno Udrih (5)
| FedExForum17,579
| 31–12
|- style="background:#cfc;"
| 44 || January 26 || Orlando
| 
| Zach Randolph (24)
| Randolph & Gasol (10)
| Zach Randolph (6)
| FedExForum15,407
| 32–12
|- style="background:#cfc;"
| 45 || January 27 || @ Dallas
| 
| Zach Randolph (22)
| Zach Randolph (10)
| Marc Gasol (6)
| American Airlines Center20,160
| 33–12
|- style="background:#cfc;"
| 46 || January 29 || Denver
| 
| Zach Randolph (15)
| Zach Randolph (17) 
| Nick Calathes (9)
| FedExForum16,736
| 34–12
|- style="background:#cfc;"
| 47 || January 31 || Oklahoma City
| 
| Zach Randolph (21)
| Zach Randolph (18)  
| Marc Gasol (5)
| FedExForum18,119
| 35–12

|- style="background:#cfc;"
| 48 || February 2 || @ Phoenix
| 
| Mike Conley (23)
| Kosta Koufos (11)
| Marc Gasol (8)
| US Airways Center17,199
| 36–12
|- style="background:#cfc;"
| 49 || February 4 || @ Utah
| 
| Marc Gasol (23)
| Zach Randolph (11)
| Nick Calathes (7)
| EnergySolutions Arena19,911
| 37–12
|- style="background:#fcc;"
| 50 || February 6 || @  Minnesota
| 
| Green, Conley & Gasol (15)
| Zach Randolph (10)
| Mike Conley (7)
| Target Center14,388
| 37–13
|- style="background:#cfc;"
| 51 || February 8 || Atlanta
| 
| Mike Conley (21)
| Zach Randolph (15)
| Mike Conley (6)
| FedExForum18,119
| 38–13
|- style="background:#cfc;"
| 52 || February 10 || Brooklyn
| 
| Zach Randolph (19)
| Marc Gasol (11)
| Conley, Green & Allen (4)
| FedExForum16,901
| 39–13
|- style="background:#fcc;"
| 53 || February 11 || @ Oklahoma City
| 
| Zach Randolph (19)
| Zach Randolph (19)
| Randolph & Calathes (4)
| Chesapeake Energy Arena18,203
| 39–14
|- style="text-align:center;"
| colspan="9" style="background:#bbcaff;"|All-Star Break
|- style="background:#cfc;"
| 54 || February 22 || @ Portland
| 
| Marc Gasol (21)
| Zach Randolph (9)
| Mike Conley (8)
| Moda Center19,782
| 40–14
|- style="background:#cfc;"
| 55 || February 23 || @ L.A. Clippers
| 
| Mike Conley (18)
| Zach Randolph (10)
| Mike Conley (7)
| Staples Center19,161
| 41–14
|- style="background:#fcc;"
| 56 || February 25 || @ Sacramento
| 
| Zach Randolph (20)
| Kosta Koufos (9)
| Mike Conley (7)
| Sleep Train Arena16,794
| 41–15
|- style="background:#fcc;"
| 57 || February 27 || L.A. Clippers
| 
| Zach Randolph (20)
| Zach Randolph (10)
| Courtney Lee (4)
| FedExForum18,119
| 41–16
|- style="background:#cfc;"
| 58 || February 28 || @ Minnesota
| 
| Marc Gasol (27)
| Randolph & Gasol (11)
| Nick Calathes (6)
| Target Center19,356
| 42–16

|- style="background:#fcc;"
| 59 || March 3 || Utah
| 
| Courtney Lee (18)
| Kosta Koufos (10)
| Green & Conley (4)
| FedExForum16,779
| 42–17
|- style="background:#cfc;"
| 60 || March 4 || @ Houston
| 
| Marc Gasol (21)
| Randolph & Allen (8)
| Randolph, Gasol & Conley (6)
| Toyota Center18,224
| 43–17
|- style="background:#cfc;"
| 61 || March 6 || L.A. Lakers
| 
| Zach Randolph (24)
| Zach Randolph (13)
| Mike Conley (6)
| FedExForum17,399
| 44–17
|- style="background:#fcc;"
| 62 || March 7 || @ New Orleans
| 
| Jeff Green (20)
| Tony Allen (8)
| Nick Calathes (7)
| Smoothie King Center17,346
| 44–18
|- style="background:#cfc;"
| 63 || March 9 || @ Chicago
| 
| Marc Gasol (23)
| Zach Randolph (9)
| Mike Conley (9)
| United Center21,815
| 45–18
|- style="background:#fcc;"
| 64 || March 11 || @ Boston
| 
| Mike Conley (20)
| Zach Randolph (8)
| Zach Randolph (5)
| TD Garden17,135
| 45–19
|- style="background:#fcc;"
| 65 || March 12 || @ Washington
| 
| Stokes & Green (13)
| Jarnell Stokes (8)
| Beno Udrih (5)
| Verizon Center18,186
| 45–20
|- style="background:#cfc;"
| 66 || March 14 || Milwaukee
| 
| Courtney Lee (18)
| Gasol & Koufos (7)
| Marc Gasol (7)
| FedExForum18,119
| 46–20
|- style="background:#cfc;"
| 67 || March 16 || Denver
| 
| Zach Randolph (21)
| Zach Randolph (16)
| Gasol & Calathes (3)
| FedExForum16,614
| 47–20
|- style="background:#fcc;"
| 68 || March 17 || @ Detroit
| 
| Jeff Green (21)
| Marc Gasol (11)
| Beno Udrih (9)
| The Palace of Auburn Hills14,399
| 47–21
|- style="background:#cfc;"
| 69 || March 20 || @ Dallas
| 
| Zach Randolph (21)
| Marc Gasol (10)
| Zach Randolph (5)
| American Airlines Center20,399
| 48–21
|- style="background:#cfc;"
| 70 || March 21 || Portland
| 
| Jeff Green (23)
| Tony Allen (11)
| Mike Conley (9)
| FedExForum17,898
| 49–21
|- style="background:#cfc;"
| 71 || March 23 || @ New York
| 
| Zach Randolph (23)
| Marc Gasol (8)
| Zach Randolph (5) 
| Madison Square Garden19,812
| 50–21
|- style="background:#fcc;"
| 72 || March 25 || Cleveland
| 
| Marc Gasol (18)
| Tony Allen (8)
| Conley & Calathes (9)
| FedExForum18,119
| 50–22
|- style="background:#fcc;"
| 73 || March 27 || Golden State
| 
| Conley & Green (16)
| Jeff Green (8)
| Mike Conley (5)
| FedExForum18,119
| 50–23
|- style="background:#fcc;"
| 74 || March 29 || @ San Antonio
| 
| Zach Randolph (20)
| Zach Randolph (13)
| Mike Conley (9)
| AT&T Center18,581
| 50–24
|- style="background:#cfc;"
| 75 || March 30 || Sacramento
| 
| Mike Conley (18)
| Kosta Koufos (12)
| Marc Gasol (6)
| FedExForum17,218
| 51–24

|- style="background:#cfc;"
| 76 || April 3 || Oklahoma City
| 
| Jeff Green (22)
| Kosta Koufos (11)
| Mike Conley (7)
| FedExForum18,119
| 52–24
|- style="background:#fcc;"
| 77 || April 4 || Washington
| 
| Marc Gasol (18)
| Marc Gasol (14)
| Mike Conley (8)
| FedExForum18,119
| 52–25
|- style="background:#cfc;"
| 78 || April 8 || New Orleans
| 
| Gasol & Green & Randolph (15)
| Zach Randolph (13)
| Gasol & Randolph (6)
| FedExForum17,518
| 53–25
|- style="background:#cfc;"
| 79 || April 10 || @ Utah
| 
| Marc Gasol (22)
| Zach Randolph (10)
| Zach Randolph (6)
| EnergySolutions Arena18,873
| 54–25
|- style="background:#fcc;"
| 80 || April 11 || @ L.A. Clippers
| 
| Zach Randolph (21)
| Zach Randolph (13)
| Zach Randolph (5)
| Staples Center19,401
| 54–26
|- style="background:#fcc;"
| 81 || April 13 || @ Golden State
| 
| Jordan Adams (19)
| JaMychal Green (8)
| Gasol & Randolph & Smith (4)
| Oracle Arena19,596
| 54–27
|- style="background:#cfc;"
| 82 || April 15 || Indiana
| 
| Marc Gasol (33)
| Marc Gasol (13)
| Nick Calathes (6)
| FedExForum17,109
| 55–27

Playoffs

|- style="background:#bfb;"
| 1
| April 19
| Portland
| 
| Beno Udrih (20)
| Gasol & Randolph (11)
| Gasol, Udrih (7)
| FedExForum18,119
| 1–0
|- style="background:#bfb;"
| 2
| April 22
| Portland
| 
| Conley & Lee (18)
| Zach Randolph (10)
| Mike Conley (6)
| FedExForum18,119
| 2–0
|- style="background:#bfb;"
| 3
| April 25
| @ Portland
| 
| Marc Gasol (25)
| Marc Gasol (7)
| Conley, Gasol & Randolph (4)
| Moda Center19,945
| 3–0
|- style="background:#fbb;"
| 4
| April 27
| @ Portland
| 
| Marc Gasol (21)
| Tony Allen (10)
| Marc Gasol (6)
| Moda Center19,541
| 3–1
|-  style="background:#bfb;"
| 5
| April 30
| Portland
| 
| Marc Gasol (26)
| Marc Gasol (14)
| Allen & Calathes (4)
| FedExForum18,119
| 4–1

|-  style="background:#fbb;"
| 1
| May 3
| @ Golden State
| 
| Marc Gasol (21)
| Gasol & Randolph (9)
| Zach Randolph (5)
| Oracle Arena19,596
| 0–1
|- style="background:#bfb;"
| 2
| May 5
| @ Golden State
| 
| Mike Conley (22)
| Carter & Randolph (7)
| Zach Randolph (4)
| Oracle Arena19,596
| 1–1
|- style="background:#bfb;"
| 3
| May 9
| Golden State
| 
| Zach Randolph (22)
| Marc Gasol (15)
| Mike Conley (5)
| FedEx Forum18,119
| 2–1
|- style="background:#fbb;"
| 4
| May 11
| Golden State
| 
| Marc Gasol (22)
| Zach Randolph (11)
| Mike Conley (7)
| FedEx Forum18,119
| 2–2
|- style="background:#fbb;"
| 5
| May 13
| @ Golden State
| 
| Marc Gasol (18)
| Marc Gasol (12)
| Marc Gasol (6)
| Oracle Arena19,596
| 2–3
|- style="background:#fbb;"
| 6
| May 15
| Golden State
| 
| Marc Gasol (21)
| Marc Gasol (12)
| Mike Conley (9)
| FedEx Forum18,119
| 2–4

Player statistics

Summer League

|-
|}

Preseason

|-
|}

Regular season

|-
| 
| 30 || 0 || 8.3 || .407 || .400 || .609 || .9 || .5 || .5 || .2 || 3.1
|-
| 
| 63 || 41 || 26.2 || .495 || .345 || .627 || 4.4 || 1.4 || style=";"| 2.0 || .5 || 8.6
|-
| 
| 58 || 0 || 14.4 || .421 || .256 || .533 || 1.8 || 2.5 || 1.1 || .1 || 4.2
|-
| 
| 66 || 1 || 16.5 || .333 || .297 || .789 || 2.0 || 1.2 || .7 || .2 || 5.8
|-
| 
| 70 || 70 || 31.8 || .446 || .386 || .859 || 3.0 || style=";"| 5.4 || 1.3 || .2 || 15.8
|-
| 
| style=";"| 81 || style=";"| 81 || style=";"| 33.2 || .494 || .176 || .795 || 7.8 || 3.8 || .9 || style=";"| 1.6 || style=";"| 17.4
|-
| 
| 20 || 1 || 7.0 || .575 || .000 || .800 || 2.0 || .2 || .3 || .2 || 2.7
|-
| 
| 45 || 37 || 30.2 || .427 || .362 || .825 || 4.2 || 1.8 || .6 || .5 || 13.1
|-
| 
| style=";"| 81 || 3 || 16.6 || .508 || . || .647 || 5.3 || .5 || .4 || .8 || 5.2
|-
| 
| 77 || 74 || 30.6 || .448 || .402 || .860 || 2.3 || 2.0 || 1.0 || .2 || 10.1
|-
| 
| 63 || 6 || 13.1 || .443 || .241 || .627 || 3.3 || .7 || .3 || .1 || 4.5
|-
| 
| 1 || 0 || 6.0 || .000 || . || . || .0 || .0 || 1.0 || .0 || .0
|-
| 
| 30 || 2 || 18.0 || .356 || .233 || .700 || 1.9 || .9 || .2 || .2 || 4.5
|-
| 
| 26 || 9 || 24.2 || .410 || style=";"| .455 || .833 || 3.2 || 1.4 || .3 || .2 || 7.3
|-
| 
| 71 || 71 || 32.5 || .487 || .350 || .765 || style=";"| 10.5 || 2.2 || 1.0 || .2 || 16.1
|-
| 
| 6 || 0 || 6.0 || .400 || .200 || .923 || .5 || 1.0 || .5 || .0 || 4.2
|-
| 
| 19 || 2 || 6.6 || .568 || . || .536 || 1.8 || .2 || .3 || .3 || 3.0
|-
| 
| 2 || 0 || 3.5 || style=";"| 1.000 || . || style=";"| 1.000 || .0 || .5 || .0 || .0 || 2.0
|-
| 
| 79 || 12 || 18.9 || .487 || .268 || .853 || 1.8 || 2.8 || .6 || .1 || 7.7
|}

Playoffs

|-
| 
| 4 || 0 || 2.5 || style=";"| .667 || style=";"| 1.000 || .500 || .3 || .0 || .3 || .0 || 1.8
|-
| 
| 10 || 9 || 27.9 || .491 || .143 || .750 || 5.2 || 1.5 || style=";"| 2.4 || 1.1 || 6.6
|-
| 
| 9 || 3 || 14.0 || .333 || .462 || .375 || 1.8 || 1.8 || 1.0 || .1 || 3.7
|-
| 
| style=";"| 11 || 0 || 17.8 || .403 || .250 || .889 || 4.3 || 1.0 || .6 || .2 || 6.3
|-
| 
| 8 || 8 || 30.4 || .427 || .303 || .821 || 1.1 || style=";"| 5.0 || 1.4 || .0 || 14.4
|-
| 
| style=";"| 11 || style=";"| 11 || style=";"| 37.8 || .394 || .000 || .852 || style=";"| 10.3 || 4.5 || .9 || style=";"| 1.7 || style=";"| 19.7
|-
| 
| 5 || 0 || 1.6 || .000 || .000 || style=";"| 1.000 || .6 || .0 || .2 || .2 || .4
|-
| 
| style=";"| 11 || 2 || 27.1 || .333 || .222 || .846 || 4.7 || 1.7 || .5 || .5 || 8.9
|-
| 
| style=";"| 11 || 0 || 11.5 || .548 || . || .600 || 3.5 || .4 || .4 || .5 || 3.4
|-
| 
| style=";"| 11 || style=";"| 11 || 33.4 || .550 || .467 || .957 || 2.5 || 2.2 || 1.1 || .0 || 13.3
|-
| 
| 4 || 0 || 2.3 || .500 || . || . || 1.3 || .0 || .0 || .0 || 1.0
|-
| 
| style=";"| 11 || style=";"| 11 || 34.7 || .423 || .200 || .879 || 8.5 || 2.1 || .5 || .0 || 15.6
|-
| 
| 2 || 0 || 1.5 || . || . || . || .0 || 1.0 || .0 || .0 || .0
|-
| 
| 10 || 0 || 17.5 || .425 || .250 || .833 || 2.0 || 2.1 || .5 || .0 || 7.6
|}

Injuries

Roster

Transactions

Trades

Free agents

Re-signed

Additions

Subtractions

Awards

References

External links
 2014–15 Memphis Grizzlies preseason at ESPN
 2014–15 Memphis Grizzlies regular season at ESPN

Memphis Grizzlies seasons
Memphis Grizzlies
Memphis Grizzlies
Memphis Grizzlies
Events in Memphis, Tennessee